Rusyliv Falls is located on the Rusyliv  river in Chortkiv Raion, Ternopil Oblast, Ukraine, a few km to the east from village of Rusyliv. The Rusyliv Falls consist of 15 falls (with height:  1.5–12 m and width: 10–15 m) within 3 km on the Rusyliv river (right tributary of the Strypa River)

See also
 Waterfalls of Ukraine

External links
 

Waterfalls of Ukraine
Strypa
Natural heritage sites in Ternopil Oblast
WRusyliv